"Dear Old Nebraska U" (also commonly referred to as "There Is No Place Like Nebraska") is a fight song of the University of Nebraska–Lincoln often played at football games by the University of Nebraska Cornhusker Marching Band.  There are three other fight songs, "Hail Varsity," "March of the Cornhuskers," and "The Cornhusker (Come a Runnin' Boys)".

History
In Nebraska, the lyrics and music are attributed to Harry Pecha, a 1924 Nebraska graduate. However, other schools and locales across the United States - including the University of Chicago, the University of Florida, and the Toledo, Ohio public school system - sing similar tunes, often with similar lyrics.

References

University of Nebraska–Lincoln
American college songs
College fight songs in the United States
Big Ten Conference fight songs
Music of Nebraska
Year of song missing